Matthew Daniel Noszka (born October 27, 1992) is an American actor and model.

Early life
Noszka was raised in Pittsburgh, Pennsylvania and relocated to New York City. He attended Chartiers Valley High School in Pittsburgh, and attended Point Park University on a basketball scholarship where he pursued a degree in business. Once the spring term of his junior year ended, Noszka started working odd jobs such as construction for the duration of the summer break. In 2014, after he successfully built a deck alongside his family friend Mike, he posted a photo on Instagram. After posting the photo, Noszka was contacted by a representative from a agency based in New York City. Within days, Noszka was booked for a Nike modeling gig.

Modeling
He has modeled for Nike, Calvin Klein, Hugo Boss, Tom Ford, Ralph Lauren, Versace, Moncler, Benetton, and Levi's. In 2015, he walked the runway for H&M. In 2016 Vogue magazine named him one of the 50 fittest boys.

Personal life
Noszka is an avid basketball player. His grandfather, Stan Noszka, was a former professional basketball player for the Boston Celtics.

Noszka also owns a motorsport company in Los Angeles, California called 412 Motorsport.

In May 2020, he announced through social media that his girlfriend of three years Inanna Sarkis was six months pregnant with their first child, a baby girl. On September 12, 2020, she gave birth to a daughter.

Filmography

Film

Television

References

External links
 
 Matthew Noszka on Instagram
 Matthew Noszka on Facebook
 Matthew Noszka on Twitter

Male models from Pennsylvania
Point Park University alumni
1992 births
Living people
Male actors from Pittsburgh
American people of Polish descent
American people of Irish descent
American people of German descent